Hargreave may refer to:

 Charles James Hargreave (1820–1866), English judge and mathematician
 Sam Hargreave (1875–1929), English cricketer

See also 
Hargreaves (surname)
Hargrave (surname)